The 1951 Buffalo Bulls football team was an American football team that represented the University of Buffalo as an independent during the 1951 college football season. In its fourth and final season under head coach James B. Wilson, the team compiled a 4–4 record. The team played its home games at Civic Stadium in Buffalo, New York.

Schedule

References

Buffalo Bulls
Buffalo Bulls football seasons
Buffalo Bulls football